Adarki is a village in Phaltan Taluka in the Satara District of Maharashtra State, India. At the 2011 census, the village had a population of 2704.

References 

Villages in Satara district